The Raid on Anuradhapura Air Force Base, code-named Operation Ellaalan, was a commando raid conducted on SLAF Anuradhapura an Air Force Base in Anuradhapura, Sri Lanka by the Liberation Tigers of Tamil Eelam. The attack happened on 22 October 2007.

At 3:15 AM a group of 21 LTTE commandos, most of them Black Tigers, who are known to be suicide bombers, attacked the air base. Shortly after the attack started the Tigers were supported by two light aircraft from the Air Tigers which conducted a bombing run on the base and escaped undamaged. 10 military personnel, including 2 Air Force officers, were killed in the attack and 22 were wounded. It was confirmed that 20 of the 21 commandos were killed. Also an Air Force Bell 212 helicopter gunship that was sent to the base to provide help crashed near the base during the clashes killing four crew members. Initially it was reported that only three aircraft were destroyed and one crashed. However the Prime Minister stated two days later that up to 8 aircraft were destroyed in the attack and another 10 were damaged, whereas the LTTE claimed to have destroyed 15 aircraft on the day of the attack. Because of this the sincerity of the government came into question. Also two MI 24s damaged in LTTE air attack on SLAF base in Anuradhapura

B. Raman, a retired Additional Secretary of India and former Director of Institute of Topical Studies of Chennai, released a statement regarding the attack calling that it "had been preceded by painstaking intelligence collection, planning .

References

External links
LTTE releases names of Black Tigers in airbase raid

2007 in Sri Lanka
Aerial operations and battles involving Sri Lanka
Liberation Tigers of Tamil Eelam attacks in Eelam War IV
Terrorist attacks on airports
Terrorist incidents in Sri Lanka in 2007
Attacks on military installations in the 2000s
October 2007 events in Asia